Neopatetris is a genus of moths in the family Gelechiidae. It contains the species Neopatetris tenuis, which is found in Namibia and South Africa.

References

Apatetrinae